2063 Bacchus, provisional designation , is a stony asteroid and near-Earth object of the Apollo group, approximately 1 kilometer in diameter. The contact binary was discovered on 24 April 1977, by American astronomer Charles Kowal at the Palomar Observatory in California, United States. It was named after Bacchus from Roman mythology.

Orbit and classification 

Bacchus orbits the Sun at a distance of 0.7–1.5 AU once every 1 years and 1 month (409 days). Its orbit has an eccentricity of 0.35 and an inclination of 9° with respect to the ecliptic. The asteroid's observation arc begins with its official discovery observation at Palomar. Due to its eccentric orbit, it is also a Venus-crosser.

Approaches 

On 31 March 1996, it passed  from Earth.

Physical characteristics 

In the SMASS classification, Bacchus is a Sq-type, that transitions from the common S-type asteroids to the Q-type asteroids. It is a contact binary with bilobate shape.

In March 1996 radar observations were conducted at the Goldstone Observatory under the direction of JPL scientists Steven Ostro and Lance Benner, allowing the construction of a model of the object. Optical observations were conducted by Petr Pravec, Marek Wolf, and Lenka Šarounová during March and April 1996. It was also photometrically observed by American astronomer Brian Warner in 2015.

According to the survey carried out by the NEOWISE mission of NASA's Wide-field Infrared Survey Explorer, Bacchus measures 1.03 kilometers in diameter and its surface has an albedo of 0.19. The Collaborative Asteroid Lightcurve Link assumes a standard albedo for stony asteroids of 0.20 and derives a diameter of 1.05 kilometers based on an absolute magnitude of 17.25.

Naming 

This minor planet was named for the Roman god Bacchus (Dionysus).The official  was published by the Minor Planet Center on 1 August 1978.

References

External links
 Asteroid Radar Group page
 Asteroid Lightcurve Database (LCDB), query form (info )
 Dictionary of Minor Planet Names, Google books
 Asteroids and comets rotation curves, CdR – Observatoire de Genève, Raoul Behrend
 
 
 

002063
Discoveries by Charles T. Kowal
Named minor planets
002063
002063
19770424